This is a list of notable real estate companies of Bangladesh.

A

 atz

B

 Bashundhara Group

E

 Eastern Housing Limited
 Estate management partners limited (EMPL)

G

 Glorious Lands & Developments Limited

K
 Krishibid Group
 Krishibid Group Real Estate
 Krishibid City
 Krishibid Properties Limited

M
 Modhu City
 M. M. Ispahani Limited

N
 Next Plan Development Ltd--- NPDL
 

 Navana Group

O

 Orion Group (Bangladesh)

R

 Rangs Group
 RUNNER Properties Limited

S
 South Asian holdings ltd.
 Sheltech

References

Companies
Real estate